Amirabad (also Romanized as Amīrābād; also known as Shahīdābād) is a village in Bala Larijan Rural District, Larijan District, Amol County, Mazandaran Province, Iran. According to the 2006 census, its population was 60, in 17 families.

References 

Populated places in Amol County